Slant-6, Slant 6, or Slant Six may refer to:
 Chrysler Slant-6 automobile engine
 Slant 6, a punk-rock band from Washington, D.C.
 Slant Six Games, a video-game developer from Vancouver, BC